Abd al-Rahim Ahmad Ali al-Hasini is an Iraqi politician and secretary-general of the Shia Islamist Islamic Virtue Party, which is based in Basra.

He succeeded Nadim al-Jabiri in May 2006, and told Al-Hayat newspaper that the party planned to protect the youth by erecting barricades against "civilisational assaults". He said civil war was unlikely in Iraq, and differences could be overcome.

References

Living people
Islamic Virtue Party politicians
Year of birth missing (living people)